Pronuba lenkoi is a species of beetle in the family Cerambycidae. It was described by Monné and Martins in 1974.

References

Eburiini
Beetles described in 1974